DIF may refer to:

Computing 
 Data Integrity Field, to protect data from corruption
 Data Interchange Format
 Digital Interface Format of DV video

Other uses 
 DIF a bank deposit insurance fund in the Commonwealth of Massachusetts, U.S.A. The Massachusetts DIF is similar to the U.S. government's Federal Deposit Insurance Corporation (FDIC)
 Dif, a settlement in Kenya
 DIF (Mexibús), a BRT station in Ecatepec de Morelos, Mexico
 DIF (technique) for controlling plant height
 National Olympic Committee and Sports Confederation of Denmark (Danmarks Idræts-Forbund)
 Desarrollo Integral de la Familia (Integral Family Development), Mexico
 Differential item functioning
 Differentiation-inducing factor
 Djurgårdens IF, a sports club in Sweden
 Dubai Investment Fund, an investment firm of Dubai
 Dublin Irish Festival, an annual cultural festival held in Dublin, Ohio, USA